Geophilus angustatus is a species of soil centipede in the family Geophilidae found on the Aleutian Islands. It's dark red, with 41–43 leg pairs; the antennae are cylindrical and about twice as long as the feet. Like other geophilomorphs, the antennae are 14-segmented. Its name comes from Latin 'angustatum', meaning 'narrowed', referring to its anteriorly narrowed body.

References

angustatus
Animals described in 1823
Fauna of the Aleutian Islands
Taxa named by Johann Friedrich von Eschscholtz
Endemic fauna of Alaska